FCM Bank Limited is a Maltese bank.

FCM Bank was granted its operating licence in 2010 and is made up of directors and a management team, operating from an office in St. Julian's, Malta. FCM Bank launched its first products to the general public in June 2012.

In 2014, FCM introduced internet banking services.

According to the European Central Bank, there are three very large banks operating in Malta, and the FCM Bank is listed among sixteen smaller banks also in operation there.

The FCM Bank participates in community activities, including sponsoring the annual Earth Garden Festival and the University Ring Road Fun Run/Walk & Relay.

References

External links 
 

Banks of Malta
Banks established in 2012